The 2013 LFL US Season was the fourth season of LFL United States, the first in the rebranded Legends Football League, and the fifth in the combined history of that league and its predecessor, the Lingerie Football League. The season featured 12 teams in various cities across the United States. In 2012, the league decided to move to a spring and summer schedule, beginning in March, 2013. For the 2013 season the league granted two new franchises: Omaha Heart and Atlanta Steam. The Toronto Triumph was, as scheduled, realigned into the league's Canadian division, LFL Canada, for the 2012 season. The Orlando Fantasy officially suspended operations, while the Tampa Breeze relocated to Jacksonville, Florida to become the Jacksonville Breeze.

For the 2013 season, the LFL released a new division structure, splitting the twelve teams into four divisions. Opening night of the 2013 was on March 30, 2013, between Atlanta Steam and Jacksonville Breeze, while Chicago Bliss and Green Bay Chill ended the regular season on August 10, 2013. For the first time, Conference division playoffs were held on August 17, 2013 at Sears Centre in Hoffman Estates, Illinois between the No. 2 and No. 3 seeds of both the Eastern and Western Conferences, with the winners playing the No.1 seeds in the Conference Championship games on August 24, 2013 at Citizens Business Bank Arena in Ontario, California. The 2013 LFL US Legends Cup (formerly the Lingerie Bowl) was played at Orleans Arena in Las Vegas, Nevada on September 1, 2013 between the Philadelphia Passion and Chicago Bliss. The Chicago Bliss won the Legends bowl 38–14, its first championship in the LFL.

Developments
In 2012, the league decided to officially move the next LFL United States season to April 2013. The league stated the reasoning behind the postponement of the schedule was to move the league to a spring and summer schedule, mirroring every other indoor American football league of the past decade, as the commissioner felt that there was greater opportunity for success in the spring; the league also stated the hiatus would allow the league offices to focus on the introductory world tours scheduled for late 2012. LFL Canada was not affected by the change and continues to play its fall 2012 schedule as originally announced. The commissioner denied the suggestion that the move was a suspension of operations. On January 10, 2013, the league announced it was abandoning its original premise as the Lingerie Football League and would rebrand as the Legends Football League, with more conventional sportswear replacing the lingerie for uniforms.

The LFL announced its first expansion team for the 2013 season would be the Omaha Heart, located in Omaha, Nebraska, playing at the Ralston Arena. This was followed by a new expansion team in Saint Charles, Missouri (serving the St. Louis metropolitan area), playing in the St. Charles Convention Center, to be known as the St. Louis Saints. However, negotiations to play at the arena fell through, with the league suspending operations of the franchise indefinitely. St. Charles officials cited the league's refusal to guarantee fixed dates and money, while the league argued that the arena did not meet requirements of a top-tier facility. On October 2, 2012, the LFL announced that Atlanta had been granted an expansion franchise to play in the 2013 LFL US season. The Atlanta Steam played its home matches at the Arena at Gwinnett Center in Duluth, Georgia.

On May 24, 2012, the LFL officially temporarily suspended operations of the Orlando Fantasy franchise for the 2013 season.

For the 2013 season, the Tampa Breeze moved to Jacksonville, Florida to become known as the Jacksonville Breeze. The move was primarily driven by the owners of the Tampa Bay Times Forum, who also own the Arena Football League team the Tampa Bay Storm, deciding not to compete with the Tampa Breeze for tickets sales now that the LFL shifted its regular season schedule to coincide with the Arena Football League schedule. The team played its home matches at Jacksonville Veterans Memorial Arena, which previously hosted the 2011 LFL US Conference Playoffs.

The Philadelphia Passion announced that it will play its home games at PPL Park in Chester, Pennsylvania for the 2013 season. PPL Park is an outdoor soccer stadium, a venue that would have not been viable in the fall given eastern Pennsylvania's weather during that season. Chicago Bliss returned to playing at the Sears Centre in Hoffman Estates, Illinois.

Due to a new divisional structure, the league expanded its playoff series to include the top three teams in each conference. The best team in each conference was awarded a first round bye, while the other divisional champions played off against the third best teams in the conference in the Divisional Playoff round. The Conference Division Playoffs were played at Sears Centre in Hoffman Estates, Illinois on Saturday, August 17. The matches were originally scheduled to be played at 1stBank Center in Denver, Colorado. The Conference Championship games were played on August 24, 2013 at Citizens Business Bank Arena in Ontario, California.

The 2013 Legends Cup (formerly the Lingerie Bowl) was played at Orleans Arena in Las Vegas, Nevada on September 1, 2013. The game was originally awarded to the city of Pittsburgh, Pennsylvania with the match to be played at Highmark Stadium. Pittsburgh has been named as an LFL expansion city for the 2014 season. However, due to higher ticket sales than the 3,000 seat Highmark could accommodate, an announcement was made June 1, 2013 that the championship game would move to PPL Park in the Philadelphia suburb of Chester, Pennsylvania On July 5, 2013 the game was once again moved to Las Vegas after the LFL and Las Vegas partners negotiated a multi-year agreement to keep the LFL US Legends Cup in Las Vegas for at least the next 3 years.

Teams

Schedule

Playoffs

Standings

Eastern Conference
Northeastern Division

Southeastern Division

Western Conference
Midwestern Division

Pacific Division

 * conference champion, " division winner, ^ clinched playoff berth

Awards
League MVP
 Anne Erler - Green Bay Chill
 Laurel Creel - Seattle Mist
 Ashley Salerno - Los Angeles Temptation
 Adrian Purnell - Jacksonville Breeze
 Heather Furr - Chicago Bliss
 Chrisdell Harris - Chicago Bliss

Offensive Player of the Year
 Anna Heasman - Green Bay Chill
 Anne Erler - Green Bay Chill
 Chrisdell Harris - Chicago Bliss
 Ashley Salerno - Los Angeles Temptation
 Nikki Johnson - Las Vegas Sin

Defensive Player of the Year
 Adrian Purnell - Jacksonville Breeze
 Cassandra Strickland - Las Vegas Sin
 Saige Steinmetz - Jacksonville Breeze
 Theresa Petruziello - Cleveland Crush
 Kym Jack - Baltimore Charm

Rookie of the Year
 Kelley Schroeder - Las Vegas Sin
 Shuree Hyatt - Seattle Mist
 Anna Heasman - Green Bay Chill
 Alli Alberts - Chicago Bliss
 Meagan Larson - Philadelphia Passion

Mortaza Award
 Jessica Hopkins - Seattle Mist
 Kelly Campbell - Baltimore Charm
 Monique Gaxiola - Los Angeles Temptation
 Angela Rypien - Baltimore Charm
 Brittany Morgan - Atlanta Steam

Most Improved Player
 Angela Rypien - Baltimore Charm
 Laurel Creel - Seattle Mist
 Danika Brace - Las Vegas Sin
 Jasmine Byndloss - Los Angeles Temptation
 Kelly Campbell - Baltimore Charm

Coach of the Year
 Chris Michaelson - Seattle Mist
 Gilbert Brown - Green Bay Chill
 Keith Hac - Chicago Bliss
 Dontae Allen - Omaha Heart
 Gary Clark - Baltimore Charm

Team of the Year
 Los Angeles Temptation
 Seattle Mist
 Baltimore Charm
 Omaha Heart
 Chicago Bliss

Legends Cup MVP
 Heather Furr - Chicago Bliss

8th Man Award (Best Fan Base)
 Baltimore Charm
 Omaha Heart
 Seattle Mist
 Los Angeles Temptation
 Green Bay Chill

LFL Awards Winners

References

Lingerie Football League
Legends Football League